The 1997 season of the astronomy TV show Jack Horkheimer: Star Hustler starring Jack Horkheimer started on January 6, 1997. Towards the end of this season, the show title changed from Jack Horkheimer: Star Hustler to Jack Horkheimer: Star Gazer. The change occurred for the November 10, 1997 episode because people complained that Internet searches for the show were turning up the adult magazine Hustler instead of the TV show itself.

The show's episode numbering scheme changed several times during its run to coincide with major events in the show's history. During the 1997 season, in November, the show's numbering was restarted at -001 and included an SG at the beginning to mark the change from Start Hustler to Star Gazer.

The February 3rd show was the 1000th episode of the series. The official Star Gazer website hosts the complete scripts for each of the shows.


1997 season

References

External links 
  Star Gazer official website
 

Jack Horkheimer:Star Hustler
1997 American television seasons